The 2009–10 VCU Rams men's basketball team represented Virginia Commonwealth University during the 2009–10 college basketball season. This was head coach Shaka Smart's first season at VCU. The Rams compete in the Colonial Athletic Association and played their home games at Stuart C. Siegel Center. They finished the season 27–9, 11–7 in CAA play and lost in the semifinals of the 2010 CAA men's basketball tournament. They were champions of the 2010 College Basketball Invitational.

Preseason
In the CAA preseason polls, released October 20 in Washington, DC, VCU was predicted to finish third in the CAA. Jr. forward Larry Sanders was selected to the preseason all conference first team.

Roster
Source

Schedule and results

|-
!colspan=9 style=| Exhibition

|-
!colspan=9 style=| Regular season

|-
!colspan=10 style=| CAA Tournament

|-
!colspan=10 style=| CBI

References

VCU
VCU Rams men's basketball seasons
Vcu
College Basketball Invitational championship seasons
VCU Rams
VCU Rams